Ironworks Creek is a tributary of Mill Creek in Northampton Township, Bucks County, Pennsylvania, part of the Neshaminy Creek, and of the Delaware River watersheds.

Statistics

Pennsylvania Department of Environmental Protection designation is 02526.
US Geological Survey designation is 1192672.

Tributaries
Ironworks Creek has three unnamed tributaries, one of which joins within the Churchville Reservoir, a lake constructed in 1942 by damming up a section of the creek. The Churchville Nature Center, a facility of the Bucks County Parks and Recreation that operates a 55 acre environmental education center and nature preserve adjacent to the reservoir, works on protecting the 700+ acres of the watershed formed around the Ironworks Creek.

Geology
Ironworks Creek lies within the Stockton Formation, a sedimentary layer of rock laid down during the Triassic. Mineralogy includes sandstone, arkosic sandstone, siltstone, shale, and mudstone.

Municipalities
The stream and it tributaries lie wholly within Northampton Township.

Crossings and Bridges

See also
List of rivers of Pennsylvania
List of rivers of the United States
List of Delaware River tributaries

References

Rivers of Pennsylvania
Rivers of Bucks County, Pennsylvania
Tributaries of the Neshaminy Creek